Agdistis meylaniella is a moth in the family Pterophoridae. It is known from Anatolia.

The wingspan is 20–22 mm. The forewings are bright greyish-brown and the hindwings are grey-brown.

References

Agdistinae
Moths of Asia
Moths described in 1972